Erika Brown (born August 27, 1998) is an American swimmer.  She qualified for the 2020 Olympic Games in the  freestyle relay and individual 100m freestyle, placing 2nd in the 100m freestyle final at the US Olympic Team Trials.

Career
Brown attended William A. Hough High School in Cornelius, North Carolina. While in high school she was a four-time North Carolina state champion, winning twice in the 200 freestyle and 400 free relay events. Brown would attended college at the University of Tennessee.

At Tennessee, Brown earned 21 All-America honors, which included a national championship in the 4x50 medley relay, and 23 Southeastern Conference medals. She was also named the 2020 SEC female Swimmer of the Year.

Brown would qualify for the Team USA women's swim team at the 2020 Summer Olympics. She earned a silver medal in the women's 4x100 meter medley relay and a bronze medal in the women's 4x100 meter freestyle relay.

In October 2022, Brown was announced by USA Swimming as a roster member in the 50 meter freestyle for the 2022 World Short Course Championships, in Melbourne, Australia.

Personal life
In March 2021, Brown announced her engagement to Alec Connolly, a fellow University of Tennessee collegiate swimmer.

References

1998 births
Living people
American female freestyle swimmers
Sportspeople from Modesto, California
Swimmers from California
Medalists at the FINA World Swimming Championships (25 m)
Tennessee Volunteers women's swimmers
Swimmers at the 2020 Summer Olympics
Olympic bronze medalists for the United States in swimming
Medalists at the 2020 Summer Olympics
World Aquatics Championships medalists in swimming